Aregonis is a character in Greek mythology. According to the Argonautica Orphica, she was the wife of the seer Ampyx, himself a descendant (per some sources) of Ares, and mother of Mopsus, another seer. According to the fabulist Gaius Julius Hyginus, she was called "Chloris".

In certain telegraph codes, "Aregonis" signified "powerful".

Notes

Notes 

 Gaius Julius Hyginus, Fabulae from The Myths of Hyginus translated and edited by Mary Grant. University of Kansas Publications in Humanistic Studies. Online version at the Topos Text Project.
 The Orphic Argonautica, translated by Jason Colavito. © Copyright 2011. Online version at the Topos Text Project.

Women in Greek mythology
Thessalian characters in Greek mythology